The Forno Grande State Park is a state park in the state of Espírito Santo, Brazil.
It protects an area of Atlantic Forest and the second highest peak in the state.

Location

The Forno Grande State Park is in the municipality of Castelo, Espírito Santo.
It protects the second highest peak in the state of Espírito Santo, the  Forno Grande Peak.
It contains trails and waterfalls.
The area includes a large cloud forest at the top of the peak.
It is home to endangered species such as the cougar (Puma concolor), ocelot (Leopardus pardalis) and southern muriqui (Brachyteles arachnoides).

The park includes a visitor center with the Onça Pintada (Cougar) museum, and is open daily from 8:00 to 17:30.
The visitor center has restrooms, drinking fountains and collections of fauna and flora.
There is also a small accommodation for researchers with beds, mattresses, kitchen and bathroom.
Camping is not allowed, and there is no restaurant in the park, but there are facilities nearby.
The park gets about 200 visitors per month.

History

The Forno Grande State Park was created on 31 October 1960 as a forest reserve.
In 1998 law 7.528 converted it to a state park with the objectives of conserving fauna and flora.
It became part of the Central Atlantic Forest Ecological Corridor, created in 2002.
It has been administered by the State Institute of the Environment and Water Resources (IEMA) since September 2007.
The park was closed to visitors indefinitely in September 2016 for safety reasons, to avoid fires after a long period of drought in which the two springs had dried up.

Notes

Sources

State parks of Brazil
Protected areas of Espírito Santo
1998 establishments in Brazil